The Attorney General of the United States Virgin Islands supervises and directs the Department of Justice. In 1962, the Virgin Islands Department of Law was established as an executive department in the Government of the U.S. Virgin Islands pursuant to the Virgin Islands Code (Title 3, Chapter 8). With the passage of Act No. 5265 in 1987, the department was now referred to as the Virgin Islands Department of Justice. Additionally, the passage of Act No. 5265 placed the Bureau of Corrections under the jurisdiction and administration of the Department of Justice—remaining there until October 1, 2009. The department has the following divisions:

 Solicitor General Division
 Civil Division
 Criminal Division
 Domestic Violence Unit
 Family/Special Victims United
 Bureau of Investigations
 White Collar Crime and Public Corruption Section
 The Division of Gaming Enforcement
 Virgin Islands Civil Rights Commission
 Paternity & Child Support Division 
 Victim Services Unit
 Sexual Offender Registry

List of attorneys general (1961-present) 

 Francisco Cornerio (1961–1969)
 Peter J. O'Dea (1969–1971)
 Ronald H. Tonkin (1971–1973)
 Verne A. Hodge (1973–1976)
 Edgar D. Ross (1977–1978)
 Iver A. Swan (1978–1980)
 J'Ada Finch-Sheen (1981–1984) [1st female]
 Leroy A. Mercer (1984–1986)
 Godfrey deCastro (1986–1990)
 Rosalie S. Ballentine (1991–1995)
 Julio A. Brady (1995–1999)
 Iver A. Stridiron (1999–2004)
 Alva A. Swan (2004-2005)
 Kerry Drue (2005–2006)
 Vincent Franklin Frazer (2006–2015)
 Terri Griffiths (2015) [Acting]
 Claude E. Walker (2015–2019)
 Denise George-Counts (2019–2023)
 Carol Thomas-Jacobs Acting (2023–present)

See also 
 Attorney general
 Justice ministry
 Politics of the United States Virgin Islands
United States Department of Justice

References 

United States Attorneys General
Justice ministries
Government of the United States Virgin Islands